The Law's Lash is a 1928 American silent action film directed by Noel M. Smith and starring Robert Ellis, Mary Mayberry and LeRoy Mason. It was designed as a vehicle for Klondike the Dog, an imitator of Rin Tin Tin.

Cast
 Klondike the Dog as Scout 
 Robert Ellis as Corporal Ted Campbell 
 Mary Mayberry as Margery Neame 
 Jack Marsh as Constable Mick Maloney 
 Richard Neill as Jean LaRue 
 LeRoy Mason as Pete Rogan - Henchman 
 William Walters as Chippewa Jim - Henchman

References

Citations

Sources
 Munden, Kenneth White. The American Film Institute Catalog of Motion Pictures Produced in the United States, Part 1. University of California Press, 1997.

External links
 

1928 films
1920s action films
American silent feature films
American action films
Films directed by Noel M. Smith
American black-and-white films
Pathé Exchange films
1920s English-language films
1920s American films